The men's 100 metre breaststroke event at the 11th FINA World Swimming Championships (25m) took place 12 – 13 December 2012 at the Sinan Erdem Dome.

Records
Prior to this competition, the existing world and championship records were as follows.

No new records were set during this competition.

Results

Heats

Semifinals

Final

The final was held at 20:11.

References

External links
 2012 FINA World Swimming Championships (25 m): Men's 100 metre breaststroke entry list, from OmegaTiming.com.

Breaststroke 100 metre, men's
World Short Course Swimming Championships